Alexander Peter Chernywech (November 1, 1932 – August 25, 1989) recording as Al Cherny,  was a Canadian fiddler. He studied with Frank Nowak and played country music on CHAT-FM.

Cherney won the Canadian Old Time Fiddlers' Contest in Ontario, under the novelty class from 1959 to 1961 and the open class in both 1960 and 1961.

In the early 1970s, he was a leading studio musician, recording with musician like Gary Buck, Dick Damron, Tommy Hunter, Jesse Winchester and Sylvia Tyson. He released more than ten studio albums and received an RPM Big Country Award for Top Country Instrumentalist in 1978.

From 1964, until his passing in 1989, Cherny was a regular, featured musician on the CBC's The Tommy Hunter Show.  Cherny met Tommy Hunter when he worked at CKNX in Wingham, Ontario.

Legacy
He was posthumously inducted into the Canadian Country Music Hall of Fame in 1989. He also performed regularly on The Tommy Hunter Show, until his death in 1989, of lung cancer.

Discography

Albums

Singles

References

External links

 as Cherney
 as Cherny
Al Cherney on The Canadian Encyclopedia

1989 deaths
1932 births
20th-century Canadian violinists and fiddlers
Canadian folk fiddlers
Canadian male violinists and fiddlers
Deaths from lung cancer
Musicians from Alberta
People from Medicine Hat
20th-century Canadian male musicians